Isopimpinellin is a natural product synthesized by numerous plant species, especially species in the carrot family Apiaceae. The compound can be found in celery, garden angelica, parsnip, fruits and in the rind and pulp of limes.  Several studies have looked into the effects of isopimpinellin and other furanocoumarins (such as bergamottin and imperatorin) as anticarcinogens.  These studies have shown possible inhibition of 7,12-Dimethylbenz(a)anthracene, which are initiators of skin tumors. Evidence has also been reported that links these compounds to the inhibition of breast cancers.

Biosynthesis 
Isopimpinellin is a furanocoumarin thought to be synthesized through the mevalonate pathway via addition of dimethylallyl pyrophosphate (DMAPP) to a modified coumarate known as umbelliferone.  The biosynthesis is shown below:

References 

Furanocoumarins
O-methylated coumarins